The National Association Medical Staff Services (NAMSS) is an association for medical staff professionals in the United States.  NAMSS was established in 1971, has over 6,000 members and is headquartered in Washington, D.C. 

NAMSS followed in the footsteps of the California Association of Medical Staff Services (CAMSS) which was established in 1971.  Most States have active NAMSS Affiliate Organizations.

NAMSS provides educational opportunities for its members and works to foster public awareness of the role of medical staff professionals in quality healthcare.

Current work
NAMSS members are employed by hospitals, managed care organizations, ambulatory surgery centers, physician practice groups, medical insurance carriers, HMOs and many other locations. .

NAMSS publishes Synergy, a bi-monthly e-journal.

Qualifications gained from NAMSS
NAMSS offers two professional certifications: 
CPCS - Certified Provider Credentialing Specialist
CPMSM - Certified Professional Medical Services Management

References
President Bush Declares first annual National Medical Staff Services Awareness Week in 1992
NAMSS History

External links
NAMSS Home page

Healthcare accreditation organizations in the United States
Professional associations based in the United States
1971 establishments in the United States
Organizations established in 1971
Medical and health organizations based in Washington, D.C.